Power of Seven — or, as represented in typographic artwork on its packaging, Power of Seven7 — is the fifth studio album by British electronic music band System 7.

Track listing

References

External links 

 Power of 7 • discography on the official System 7 website

1996 albums
System 7 (band) albums